The Adams Street Double House is a historic double house located at 106-108 East Adams Street in Sandusky, Ohio.

Description and history 
The -story, masonry and stone structure was built in about 1845 in the Exotic Revival and Federal styles of architecture. Historically, it has been used as two respective houses, with each house functioning as a single family dwelling.

It was listed in the National Register of Historic Places on October 10, 1975.

References 

Houses on the National Register of Historic Places in Ohio
Houses in Erie County, Ohio
National Register of Historic Places in Erie County, Ohio
Houses completed in 1845
Federal architecture in Ohio